The North of Boston Library Exchange (NOBLE) is a consortium of 26 libraries on the North Shore of Massachusetts working to improve library service through automation. Seventeen public libraries, eight college libraries, and one special library are members.

NOBLE was the first automated resource sharing network in the state and the first Massachusetts library network on the Internet.

It was established in 1980 by five libraries sharing their circulation system. By 1995, NOBLE served 32,000 college students and 522,000 residents and kept a database that featured more than 2.3 million items.

NOBLE is governed by its member libraries who approve the annual budget, establish NOBLE policies, and elect officers. An executive board, composed of the four officers and five at-large library directors, more closely oversees NOBLE operations. A professional staff manages operations. NOBLE is a 501(c)(3) non-profit corporation and is recognized as a charitable organization by the Massachusetts Attorney General's office.

Member libraries

Public libraries:
 Beverly Public Library
 Peabody Institute Library of Danvers
 Everett Public Libraries
 Sawyer Free Library, Gloucester
 Lynn Public Library
 Lynnfield Public Library
 Abbot Public Library, Marblehead
 Melrose Public Library
 Peabody Institute Library, Peabody
 Reading Public Library
 Revere Public Library
 Salem Public Library
 Saugus Public Library
 Stoneham Public Library
 Swampscott Public Library
 Lucius Beebe Memorial Library, Wakefield
 Winthrop Public Library and Museum

Special library:
 Massachusetts Board of Library Commissioners Professional Library, Boston

Academic libraries:
 Bunker Hill Community College Library, Charlestown
 Endicott College, Halle Library, Beverly
 Gordon College, Jenks Library, Wenham
 Merrimack College, McQuade Library, North Andover
 Montserrat College of Art, Scott Library, Beverly
 Northern Essex Community College, Bentley Library, Haverhill and Lawrence
 Phillips Academy, Oliver Wendell Holmes Library, Andover
 Salem State University Library, Salem

See also
Cape Libraries Automated Materials Sharing (CLAMS)
CW MARS (Central/Western Massachusetts Automated Resource Sharing)
Merrimack Valley Library Consortium (MVLC)
Minuteman Library Network (MLN)
Old Colony Library Network (OCLN)
SAILS Library Network

References

External links
 Official site

Library consortia in Massachusetts
Non-profit organizations based in Massachusetts
Organizations established in 1980